The Confession of Sultana Daku is a 2009 historical novel by Sujit Saraf. The novel is about the swashbuckling criminal career of Sultana Daku (Daku is the Hindi for bandit ), undisputedly the most notorious dacoit in modern India's history.
He, actually, belonged to bhantu clan of criminals who terrorized the United Provinces (as Uttar Pradesh was then known) in 1920. The novel begins after he is captured by the ruling British and thrown into the Haldwani Gaol. Here, just, a few hours to the gallows, he has a change of heart and he requests for Lieutenant Colonel Samuel Pearce, the officer who played a major role in capturing him.

The officer, readily enthusiastic of Indian culture, always keeps a paper and a pencil ready, so it does not take Sultana much to pursue him to record his biography, and that's necessary because he would like his clansmen, especially his son to know how he felt and thought through his hefty upheavals throughout the ups and downs of his meteoric criminal life. Here we come to know of his deepest feelings, his love for his horse Chetak (the choice of name indicates his love for chivalry, that being the historical mount of Maharana Pratap), (while his dog's name - Rai Bahadur, perhaps hints his despise for titular kings)

References

External links
Hanging by a Tale - Michael Jansen
At Flipkart India

2009 Indian novels
Indian historical novels in English
Crime in Uttar Pradesh
Fiction set in 1920
Novels set in the 1920s